Jiangsu, a province of the People's Republic of China, is made up of three levels of administrative division: prefectural, count, and township.

Administrative divisions
All of these administrative divisions are explained in greater detail at Administrative divisions of the People's Republic of China. This chart lists only prefecture-level and county-level divisions of Jiangsu.

Recent changes in administrative divisions

Population composition

Prefectures

Counties

References

 
Jiangsu